Dick Figures: The Movie is a 2013 independent American adult animated fantasy action-adventure comedy film produced by Remochoso and Six Point Harness and distributed by Mondo Media. It is based on the animated web series Dick Figures. The film was written and directed by Ed Skudder and Zack Keller (in their feature directorial debuts) and produced by Nick Butera and Andy Fiedler. Skudder and Keller star as Red and Blue, two best friends and polar opposites who set out on a journey to find the Great Sword of Destiny for the Raccoon in order to save their friendship, Pink's birthday, and the world from Lord Takagami. It also features the voices of Eric Bauza, Ben Tuller, Shea Carter, Mike Nassar, Chad Quandt, and Lauren K. Sokolov.

It is Mondo Media's first feature-length film and independent company 6 Point Harness's first original feature film. The film was released on VOD on September 17, 2013.

Dick Figures: The Movie was split into 12 chapters and published onto YouTube by Mondo's YouTube channel at different times in September. $313,411 was raised through the mass-funding platform Kickstarter from 5,616 backers (including Warren Graff, Fred Seibert, Gundarr creators Corey McDaniel & Ted Wilson, amongst others) through May 31 to July 16, 2012, out of originally a $250,000 goal, breaking the record for the most-funded animation project through the site, until it was surpassed by Blur Studio's The Goon (an upcoming computer-animated adaptation to Eric Powell's graphic novel series of the same name) on November 2012.

Plot
In a world populated by stick figures, two stick figures named Red and Blue grow up together. As adults, they live together as roommates, with their girlfriends, Stacy and Pink. When Pink's birthday approaches, Red suggests that they go see the Raccoon at his pawnshop to get a gift for Pink.

The Raccoon tells them a story of when he lived in ancient Japan. His village fell under attack by Lord Takagami and his demon army. Raccoon, armed with the Sword of Destiny, single-handedly fought the army, but fell into a rage when he saw his wife swallowed by Ocho Muerte, a large octopus. If Blue finds the Sword and returns it to him, he will give Blue the perfect gift for Pink.

Red and Blue arrive in Japan and meet with the Raccoon's son, Son-san. They discover the hilt of the Sword and a large map with the locations of the other pieces, the blade and a jewel. Their retrieval of the hilt awakens Takagami and his ninjas, who give chase. The duo escapes out to sea on a rowboat, and they eventually end up in the middle of nowhere during an approaching storm. Lightning strikes their boat and a large wave sweeps them away. Shipwrecked on a tropical uninhabited island, they are rescued by alcoholic British pilot Captain Crookygrin. They fly to Paris, and are told to find the blade of the Sword at the Eiffel Tower, then return home to find the jewel.

Red abandons Blue to go partying. Blue decides to finish the quest alone, only to be captured by Takagami and taken to a nearby volcano where the jewel rests. Takagami reunites the jewel with the Sword and has Blue thrown into the lava. Red and Raccoon arrive just in time and a battle ensues with Red and Blue fighting the ninjas while the Raccoon fights Takagami with the Sword. Cutting off his mask, Raccoon discovers that Father-san is Takagami's real identity. Raccoon beheads him, and his remains fall into the lava, but his head transforms into Ocho Muerte, who heads off to attack their town. Ocho Muerte devours the Raccoon and nearly eats Pink, but not before Blue rescues her with the Sword. The Sword falls into Ocho Muerte's mouth and kills him in an explosion of light. They find Raccoon alive, as well as his wife Mama-san.  In return for Blue's bravery, Mama-san gives Blue and Pink the lotus flower that Papa-san once gave to her, blessing their love for each other. Red and Blue celebrate their successful quest.

Cast

Main Cast
 Ed Skudder as 
 Redward "Red", an extra-terrestrial creature from outer space and Blue's best friend.
 Papa-san "Raccoon", a Japanese wise raccoon that owns a pawn shop called "Ancient Secrets 'n' Things ".
 Captain Crookygrin, a pilot who has alcoholic blindness. who attempts to stop Red and Blue from reaching the Great Sword of Destiny, but failed to recognize the two of them. He was one of Mr. Dingleberry's friends back in the war.
 Mr. Dingleberry, an elderly man, and Red and Blue's landlord.
 Zack Keller as 
 Blewis N. "Blue" Clark, a levelheaded and serious guy, and Red's best friend.
 Jason "Trollz0r", Red and Blue's next-door neighbor.  
 Eric Bauza as Lord Takagami, the main antagonist of the movie, as well as the father and rival of his son, Papa-san.
 Ben Tuller as Lord Tourettes, an extremely overly joyful person who has Tourette's syndrome.
 Shea Carter as Meredith P. "Pink" Gurblopskey, a very mature girl who often gets annoyed and stressed out about things. She is Blue's girlfriend. and Stacy's best friend.
 Mike Nassar as Broseph, a bully who is a very stuck up and selfish person.
 Chad Quandt as Chad-Gendarmerie, a French cop who hunts down Red and Blue to retrieve the Great Sword of Destiny.
 Lauren K. Sokolov as Stacy, a promiscuous and uncivilized girl. She is Red's girlfriend, Blue's ex-girlfriend, and Pink's best friend.

Additional Voices
 Nick Ainsworth as Umbrella salesman
 Nick Keller as Party-goers
 Brock Gallagher as Bully and Dock Worker #2
 John Dusenberry as Ghetto Cutter
 Ashley Shelhon as Global Rescue Services operator
 Dave McElfatrick as Guard #1
 Rob DenBleyker as Guard #2
 David Haley as Dock Worker #1, French Father, Cumulonimbus Ninja
 Brendon Haines as Steve, TNT Boat Foreman, Dead Ninja
 Thomas Ridgewell as French Cop
 Lynn Wang as French mother (uncredited)

Production
For a short time, Ed Skudder and Zack Keller tried approaching studios to make a movie based on the series, but backed out after they didn't like the way the studios wanted to make the movie, and instead turned to Kickstarter to help get the movie made.

The movie was originally set to be a 40-minute-long special, according to the "stretch goals" announced for the Kickstarter campaign, but the film was extended to a length of 73 minutes and was also made available for public access.

Kickstarter backers David Haley, Brendan Haines, Rob DenBleyker, Dave McElfatrick and Ashley Shelhon were given an animated appearance and actual voice role in the film for their $2,500 pledge contributions.

A book called The Art of Dick Figures: The Movie was written and published by Skudder and Keller onto Amazon.com, in both paperback and Kindle versions. The book depicts some concepts, designs, storyboards and pre-production information of the movie.

Release
The film was released on VOD on September 17, 2013.

One of the film's executive producers, Aaron Simpson, aimed to give everyone access to the film, whether they could afford a paid digital download or not, so the movie was also distributed on YouTube in 12 chapters over the course of 3 months.

The film successfully had a theatrical debut at the Buffer Festival in Toronto on November 9, 2013.

Home media
Dick Figures: The Movie was released on DVD and Blu-ray in the United States by Cinedigm on December 3, 2013. The film comes with an audio commentary by Ed Skudder and Zack Keller, 5 behind the scenes featurettes, a short featurette starring Ben Tuller as Lord Tourettes and the theatrical trailer.

Sequel
In October 2014, Mondo Media announced a sequel to Dick Figures: The Movie. The sequel to this film was originally supposed to be theatrically released in all countries at the end of 2016, with Ed Skudder and Zack Keller reprising their roles and Red and Blue, but its release date was cancelled. The film is still in production, but the release date has not yet been announced, as of 2021. It is still unknown if Skudder and Keller will be reprising their roles. It is also unknown whether Mondo Media or a different company will distribute the sequel on its own.

Soundtrack

The film's soundtrack composed and created by Nick Keller using the software Apple Logic, including the complete score and the movie's closing credits theme, "Dick Figures: The Movie: The Song" performed by Ninja Sex Party, was released on September 16, 2013, one day before the film came out. Music from the original series can be heard in certain parts of the movie. The official "Dick Figures: The Movie: The Song" music video was uploaded on YouTube on April 3, 2014 by Mondo Media's YouTube channel.

Reception
The film received positive reviews from critics.

Critic Mark Bell of Film Threat stated, "It may appear to be as simple an animation as you can get, but it is perfectly executed and extremely entertaining."

John Blabber at Bubbleblabber.com gave a positive review saying, "This first entry in the series is a strong and valiant effort by some of the most respected animators in the business. However, it’s just that…a movie WRITTEN by animators."

Accolades

YouTube format
The first chapter was released on YouTube on September 17, 2013, the same day the film came out in theaters for a limited time. All 12 chapters were uploaded by Mondo Media's YouTube channel. The first chapter contains the opening to the film. The second chapter was released on September 24. The third, fourth, fifth, sixth and seventh chapters were released on October 1, 8, 15, 22 and 29, respectively. The eighth, ninth, tenth and eleventh chapters were released on November 5, 12, 19 and 26, respectively. The twelfth and final chapter was released on December 2, a day before Dick Figures: The Movie came out on DVD and Blu-ray in the United States. The final chapter contains the epilogue and the end credits.

See also
List of adult animated films

Notes

References

External links

 Official production website 
 

2013 films
2013 animated films
American independent films
American action comedy films
American adventure comedy films
2013 action comedy films
2010s adventure comedy films
2010s fantasy comedy films
American fantasy adventure films
American fantasy comedy films
American action adventure films
American science fantasy films
American science fiction action films
American science fiction adventure films
American animated comedy films
Animated films based on animated series
American animated science fantasy films
Films about raccoons
Films set in Paris
Films set in Japan
American flash animated films
Kickstarter-funded films
2010s American animated films
2013 directorial debut films
Films based on web series
Japan in non-Japanese culture
American adult animated films
Animated films about extraterrestrial life
2010s English-language films